Origny-le-Butin is a former commune in the Orne department in north-western France. On 1 January 2017, it was merged into the new commune Belforêt-en-Perche. Its population was 92 in 2019.

The area was studied in the form of a microhistory by the French historian Alain Corbin in his book The Life of an Unknown (2001).

See also
Communes of the Orne department

References

Orignylebutin